The governor of the Straits Settlements was appointed by the British East India Company until 1867, when the Straits Settlements became a Crown colony. Thereafter the governor was appointed by the Colonial Office. The position existed from 1826 to 1946. Between 1942 and 1945 the office was not filled, as the Straits Settlements was then under Japanese occupation. From the late 19th century onward, the governor of the Straits Settlements was usually also British High Commissioner in Malaya and Brunei and British Agent for Sarawak and British North Borneo.

List of British governors (1826–1946)

See also

 Colonial Secretary, Straits Settlements
 List of Chief Secretaries of Singapore
 Legislative Council of the Straits Settlements
 Governors of Singapore
 History of Singapore
 History of Malaysia
 Governor of Penang

References

Further reading
WorldStatesmen - Singapore
Historical Dictionary of Singapore (Justin Corfield) 

British rule in Singapore
Political history of Malaysia
Malaysia history-related lists
Lists of political office-holders in Singapore
Straits
 
 
Government in the British Overseas Territories